Eneli Jefimova (born 27 December 2006) is an Estonian swimmer. She competed in the women's 100 metre breaststroke event at the 2020 European Aquatics Championships, in Budapest, Hungary. In July 2021, she won the gold medal in the 100m breaststroke event at the European Junior Swimming Championships in Rome, Italy. She won a silver medal in the 100 m breaststroke event at the 2021 European Short Course Swimming Championships in Kazan, Russia.

References

External links
 

2006 births
Living people
Estonian female breaststroke swimmers
Place of birth missing (living people)
Swimmers at the 2020 Summer Olympics
Olympic swimmers of Estonia
21st-century Estonian women